Xylophanes maculator is a moth of the  family Sphingidae. It is found from Mexico and Belize to Ecuador and further south to Venezuela and Bolivia. The wingspan is 65–75 mm.

Adults are on wing in April, from June to July, August or September and from November to December in Costa Rica but might even be on wing year-round.

The larvae probably feed on Rubiaceae (such as Psychotria nervosa and Psychotria horizontalis), Fabaceae (such as Inga vera), Malvaceae and Dilleniaceae (such as Tetracera volubilis) species.

References

maculator
Moths described in 1875